McMillan is an unincorporated community in Marshall County, Oklahoma, United States.

A post office was established at McMillan, Indian Territory on March 28, 1892.  It was named for Joseph E.A. McMillan, first postmaster.

At the time of its founding, McMillan was located in Pickens County, Chickasaw Nation.

References

Unincorporated communities in Marshall County, Oklahoma
Unincorporated communities in Oklahoma